El Hacedor may refer to:

Fundación El Hacedor, non-profit organization 
Dreamtigers, or El Hacedor, book by the Argentine author Jorge Luis Borges